FC Stal Alchevsk was a Ukrainian professional football team of the Ukrainian First League that is based in Alchevsk. In the 2012–13 season the club won promotion to the Ukrainian Premier League, but the club refused this promotion "for the sake of the fans". In 2015, Stal withdrew from all Ukrainian competitions due to the escalating conflict in Eastern Ukraine.

After adopting its name Stal, the club became a phoenix club of previously existed Stal (Voroshylovsk and Komunarsk, both names of Alchevsk during the Soviet period). It is commonly being confused with another football club from Alchevsk – Kommunarets which was dissolved in 1989, six years after establishing of Stroitel Kommunarsk.

History 
The club is named after the former city's sports society Stal that was established in Alchevsk (at that time Voroshylovsk) in 1935.

The contemporary club traces its history to 1983 when in Komunarsk (name of Alchevsk in 1961–1991) was founded new amateur football club Budivelnyk (Stroitel) along with already existing professional club Komunarets. The club started out in the championship of Luhansk Oblast. During that time the city top club was Kommunarets which was in synchronization with the former name of Alchevsk – Kommunarsk in the honor of the Paris Commune. Its communist revolutionary spirit can be noticed on the contemporary club's logo. With the fall of the Soviet Union Kommunarets was relegated from the Soviet championship in 1988 and disappeared, while Budivelnyk led by Anatoliy Volobuyev became sponsored by the city's metallurgic factory and were introduced to the Ukrainian SSR championship among physical culture clubs (KFK) for the 1989 season. In 1990 the club placed second in the final tournament and was promoted to the Soviet competitions (1991 Soviet Second League B).

Stal joined the Ukrainian Premier League in 2000–2001 for its tenth season. They finished in the next-to-last place and were relegated back to the Persha Liha where they remained until the 2005–2006 season, for which they and FC Kharkiv achieved promotion back to the Ukrainian Premier League.
In 2006–2007 season Stal were relegated back to the Persha Liha, where they played till the end of the 2012–13 season in which they won promotion to the Ukrainian Premier League. But the club refused this promotion because of its Stal Stadium did not meet the requirements of the highest Ukrainian division and the club did not want to play in another stadium because it did see "no point in holding matches in another stadium as most fans of Stal won’t see them".

In 2015, Stal withdrew from all competitions due to the escalating conflict in Eastern Ukraine, with ongoing battles and artillery fired near the playing fields, the club decided it was impossible to continue operating in such conditions.

Club name 
"Stal" is a popular name in the Soviet culture and stands for "steel" (in English). The name was chosen as the pride for the heavily industrialized region of the country. A derivative of it "Stalin" was carried by the Soviet dictator Joseph Dzhugashvili.

Football kits and sponsors

Head coaches

Honors 

Ukrainian Persha Liha: 1
 Champions: 2004–05
 Runners Up: 1999–00, 2012–13

Notable players
  Andriy Smalko
  Sergej Tica

League and cup history 

{|class="wikitable"
|-bgcolor="#efefef"
! Season
! Div.
! Pos.
! Pl.
! W
! D
! L
! GS
! GA
! P
!Domestic Cup
!colspan=2|Europe
!Notes
|-
|align=center|1992
|align=center|2nd "A"
|align=center|9
|align=center|26
|align=center|9
|align=center|8
|align=center|9
|align=center|28
|align=center|22
|align=center|26
|align=center|1/16 finals
|align=center|
|align=center|
|align=center|
|-
|align=center|1992–93
|align=center|2nd
|align=center|10
|align=center|42
|align=center|16
|align=center|10
|align=center|16
|align=center|40
|align=center|37
|align=center|42
|align=center|1/64 finals
|align=center|
|align=center|
|align=center|
|-
|align=center|1993–94
|align=center|2nd
|align=center|4
|align=center|38
|align=center|22
|align=center|7
|align=center|9
|align=center|56
|align=center|40
|align=center|51
|align=center|1/16 finals
|align=center|
|align=center|
|align=center|
|-
|align=center|1994–95
|align=center|2nd
|align=center|9
|align=center|42
|align=center|19
|align=center|5
|align=center|18
|align=center|69
|align=center|50
|align=center|62
|align=center|1/8 finals
|align=center|
|align=center|
|align=center|
|-
|align=center|1995–96
|align=center|2nd
|align=center bgcolor=tan|3
|align=center|42
|align=center|26
|align=center|5
|align=center|11
|align=center|73
|align=center|40
|align=center|69
|align=center|1/16 finals
|align=center|
|align=center|
|align=center|
|-
|align=center|1996–97
|align=center|2nd
|align=center|6
|align=center|46
|align=center|23
|align=center|9
|align=center|14
|align=center|76
|align=center|43
|align=center|78
|align=center|1/32 finals 2nd stage
|align=center|
|align=center|
|align=center|
|-
|align=center|1997–98
|align=center|2nd
|align=center|4
|align=center|42
|align=center|24
|align=center|5
|align=center|13
|align=center|69
|align=center|53
|align=center|77
|align=center|1/16 finals
|align=center|
|align=center|
|align=center|
|-
|align=center|1998–99
|align=center|2nd
|align=center|9
|align=center|38
|align=center|16
|align=center|7
|align=center|15
|align=center|55
|align=center|52
|align=center|55
|align=center|1/16 finals
|align=center|
|align=center|
|align=center|
|-
|align=center|1999–00
|align=center|2nd
|align=center bgcolor=silver|2
|align=center|34
|align=center|21
|align=center|7
|align=center|6
|align=center|69
|align=center|36
|align=center|70
|align=center|1/16 finals
|align=center|
|align=center|
|align=center bgcolor=green|Promoted
|-
|align=center|2000–01
|align=center|1st
|align=center|13
|align=center|26
|align=center|3
|align=center|6
|align=center|17
|align=center|19
|align=center|49
|align=center|15
|align=center|1/16 finals
|align=center|
|align=center|
|align=center bgcolor=red|Relegated
|-
|align=center|2001–02
|align=center|2nd
|align=center|6
|align=center|34
|align=center|14
|align=center|8
|align=center|12
|align=center|42
|align=center|34
|align=center|50
|align=center|1/8 finals
|align=center|
|align=center|
|align=center|
|-
|align=center|2002–03
|align=center|2nd
|align=center|6
|align=center|34
|align=center|14
|align=center|10
|align=center|10
|align=center|36
|align=center|33
|align=center|52
|align=center|1/8 finals
|align=center|
|align=center|
|align=center|
|-
|align=center|2003–04
|align=center|2nd
|align=center|5
|align=center|34
|align=center|17
|align=center|7
|align=center|10
|align=center|69
|align=center|27
|align=center|58
|align=center|1/4 finals
|align=center|
|align=center|
|align=center|
|-
|align=center|2004–05
|align=center|2nd
|align=center bgcolor=gold|1
|align=center|34
|align=center|22
|align=center|11
|align=center|1
|align=center|69
|align=center|24
|align=center|77
|align=center|1/8 finals
|align=center|
|align=center|
|align=center bgcolor=green|Promoted
|-
|align=center|2005–06
|align=center|1st
|align=center|11
|align=center|30
|align=center|9
|align=center|9
|align=center|12
|align=center|26
|align=center|39
|align=center|36
|align=center|1/8 finals
|align=center|
|align=center|
|align=center|
|-
|align=center|2006–07
|align=center|1st
|align=center|16
|align=center|30
|align=center|5
|align=center|6
|align=center|19
|align=center|22
|align=center|38
|align=center|21
|align=center|1/8 finals
|align=center|
|align=center|
|align=center bgcolor=red|Relegated
|-
|align=center|2007–08
|align=center|2nd
|align=center|7
|align=center|38
|align=center|15
|align=center|13
|align=center|10
|align=center|52
|align=center|44
|align=center|69
|align=center|1/8 finals
|align=center|
|align=center|
|align=center|
|-
|align=center|2008–09
|align=center|2nd
|align=center|10
|align=center|32
|align=center|11
|align=center|10
|align=center|11
|align=center|33
|align=center|39
|align=center|43
|align=center|1/4 finals
|align=center|
|align=center|
|align=center|
|-
|align=center|2009–10
|align=center|2nd
|align=center bgcolor=tan|3
|align=center|34
|align=center|19
|align=center|8
|align=center|7
|align=center|55
|align=center|35
|align=center|69
|align=center|1/8 finals
|align=center|
|align=center|
|align=center|
|-
|align=center|2010–11
|align=center|2nd
|align=center bgcolor=tan|3
|align=center|34
|align=center|18
|align=center|8
|align=center|8
|align=center|55
|align=center|33
|align=center|62
|align=center|1/4 finals
|align=center|
|align=center|
|align=center|
|-
|align=center|2011–12
|align=center|2nd
|align=center|7
|align=center|34
|align=center|14
|align=center|8
|align=center|12
|align=center|51
|align=center|50
|align=center|50
|align=center|1/32 finals
|align=center|
|align=center|
|align=center|
|-
|align=center|2012–13
|align=center|2nd
|align=center bgcolor=silver|2
|align=center|34 	
|align=center|20 	
|align=center|6 	
|align=center|8 	
|align=center|58 	
|align=center|35 	
|align=center|69
|align=center|1/16 finals
|align=center|
|align=center|
|align=center|Refused promoted
|-
|align=center|2013–14
|align=center|2nd
|align=center bgcolor=tan|3
|align=center|30
|align=center|16
|align=center|3
|align=center|11
|align=center|41
|align=center|33
|align=center|51
|align=center|1/32 finals
|align=center|
|align=center|
|align=center|
|-
|align=center|2014–15
|align=center|2nd
|align=center|
|align=center|
|align=center|
|align=center|
|align=center|
|align=center|
|align=center|
|align=center|
|align=center bgcolor=pink|Withdrew
|align=center|
|align=center|
|align=center|
|}

References

External links 

 Official site
Squad, 2005–6 season
Ukrainian Soccer Team Stal

 
Defunct football clubs in Ukraine
Association football clubs established in 1983
Association football clubs disestablished in 2015
1983 establishments in Ukraine
2015 disestablishments in Ukraine
Sport in Alchevsk
Football clubs in Luhansk Oblast
Metallurgy association football clubs in Ukraine